The Battle of Swift Creek or Arrowfield Church was fought on May 9, 1864, between Union and Confederate forces during the American Civil War. Union forces were only partially successful: they inflicted damage on the local railroad, but further advance was halted.

Description

On May 9, Maj. Gen. Benjamin Butler made a thrust toward Petersburg and was met by Bushrod Johnson's Division at Swift Creek. A premature Confederate attack at Arrowfield Church was driven back with heavy losses, but Union forces did not follow up. After skirmishing, Butler seemed content to tear up the railroad tracks and did not press the defenders. In conjunction with the advance to Swift Creek, five Federal gunboats steamed up the Appomattox River to bombard Fort Clifton, while Edward W. Hincks's U.S. Colored Troops infantry division struggled through marshy ground from the land side. The gunboats were quickly driven off, and the infantry attack was abandoned.

References

Sources
National Park Service Battle Summary
CWSAC Report Update
City of Colonial Heights, Virginia
E-History

Bermuda Hundred campaign
Battles of the Eastern Theater of the American Civil War
Inconclusive battles of the American Civil War
Swift Creek
Conflicts in 1864
1864 in Virginia
Chesterfield County in the American Civil War
May 1864 events